Paisley Gilmour Street railway station is the largest of the four stations serving the town of Paisley, Renfrewshire, Scotland (the others being Paisley St. James, Paisley Canal and Hawkhead), and acts as the town's principal railway station. The station is protected as a category B listed building.

History

The station was opened on 14 July 1840 on the Glasgow, Paisley, Kilmarnock and Ayr Railway (GPK&AR). The station was used jointly by the GPK&AR and the Glasgow, Paisley and Greenock Railway (GP&GR). However, the GP&GR did not run services until March 1841 due to construction difficulties at Bishopton.
 
It was originally built with only two through platforms, with the GPK&R and the GP&GR lines separating to the west of the station. The station was later expanded to four platforms, two for the GPK&R and two for the GP&GR, with the lines separating to the east of the station.

The section between Glasgow Bridge Street railway station and Paisley Gilmour Street station was a joint line: the Glasgow and Paisley Joint Railway.

Twentieth century
The station was electrified as part of the 1967 Inverclyde Line. Ayrshire Coast Line platforms (then numbered 1 and 2) were wired, however the wires finished a short distance west of the station. These were extended as part of the Ayrshire Line electrification by British Rail in 1986. This 1986 work coincided with the renumbering of the platforms with the Glasgow bound platforms numbered 1 (Inverclyde) and 3 (Ayrshire), and the outbound platforms numbers 2 (Inverclyde) and 4 (Ayrshire).

Following extensive works, Paisley Gilmour Street now has step-free access to all platforms, and the main access onto County Square, has been joined by a re-opened back access onto Back Sneddon Street. The access was originally built along with the station, but had closed and had been converted into a model shop for a number of years. Despite this conversion the shop retained the steps up to stations lower concourse, however it has been bricked up to prevent access. When the shop owner retired, it was decided to purchase the unit and convert it back as part of the step free access works for disabled people, as it would increase space within the station, and the works were fairly simple since the original stairs were retained. After re-opening it was signed as a dedicated exit to the station for those wishing to use the bus link to the airport, as the buses stop directly outside the door and the airport cycle route which passes outside.

A collision occurred between two trains at the eastern end of the station on Easter Monday 1979 which resulted in the deaths of seven people.

Operations 

Paisley Gilmour Street is the busiest of the four Paisley stations. It has four platforms, with trains running on the Inverclyde and Ayrshire Coast lines. It is the fourth busiest railway station in Scotland, after Glasgow Central, Edinburgh Waverley, and Glasgow Queen Street.

Connecting buses from this station also serve nearby Glasgow Airport (GLA) which is approximately 2 km away. It is possible to buy a railway ticket to and from the airport, which includes not only the train journey but also the journey on McGill's 757 service. The Glasgow Airport Rail Link would have replaced this bus service with a direct train, but the project was cancelled in September 2009 due to public spending cuts. It is also possible to cycle from the station to the Airport using the Airport Cycle Route.

It is an important interchange, not only for the airport bus link, but also for many local buses which depart from the area surrounding the town centre running to destinations throughout the town of Paisley, Renfrew and to the out of town shopping centre, Braehead. It is expected that Braehead will get a dedicated bus link in the future, possibly utilising Hillington East.

The British Transport Police (BTP)  maintain a small office here on Platform 1

Services 

In the early 1980s up to the electrification of the Ayrshire Coast Line the station was served by:
 Glasgow -  (DMU): 2 trains per hour (some extended to Girvan)
 Glasgow -  (DMU): 1 train per hour
 Glasgow -  (EMU): 3 trains per hour
 Glasgow -  (EMU): 1 train per hour
 Glasgow -  (DMU): to connect with ferry to Brodick
 Glasgow -  (Loco hauled): to connect with ferry to Larne

2016

 the station is served by:
 Glasgow - Ayr (EMU): 2 trains per hour
 3 trains per day continue from Glasgow to Edinburgh via Carstairs (2 on Saturdays)
 Glasgow - Largs (EMU): 1 train per hour
 Glasgow -  (EMU): 1 train per hour (5 trains per day on Sundays)
 Glasgow - Gourock (EMU): 4 trains per hour (1 on Sundays)
 Glasgow - Wemyss Bay (EMU): 1 train per hour

Rail & Sea Connections

Northern Ireland
Trains connect Ayr along the Glasgow South Western Line to Stranraer where a bus link runs, route 350 operated by McLeans (except Sundays) to Cairnryan. for onward ferries to the Port of Belfast by Stena Line and Larne Harbour by P&O Ferries.

Former connection closed in 2016: along the Ayrshire Coast Line to Troon for the P&O Ferries service to Larne Harbour.

Argyll and Bute
Trains run from Glasgow Central to Wemyss Bay station, connecting with Caledonian MacBrayne's service to Rothesay on the Isle of Bute and to Gourock, connecting with Argyll Ferries' service to Dunoon and various Caledonian MacBrayne emergency relief routes

Isle of Arran
Trains also connect along the Ayrshire Coast Line to Ardrossan Harbour for the Caledonian MacBrayne service to Brodick.

See also
List of listed buildings in Paisley, Renfrewshire

References

Notes

Sources

External links
Video footage of Paisley Gilmour Street

Railway stations in Renfrewshire
Former Glasgow and Paisley Joint Railway stations
Railway stations in Great Britain opened in 1840
SPT railway stations
Railway stations served by ScotRail
Transport in Paisley, Renfrewshire
Listed railway stations in Scotland
Category B listed buildings in Renfrewshire
Buildings and structures in Paisley, Renfrewshire
1840 establishments in Scotland